Harold David Melton (born September 25, 1966) is a former chief justice of the Supreme Court of Georgia.

Early years and education 

A 1984 graduate of Joseph Wheeler High School in Marietta, Georgia, Melton received a Bachelor of Science from Auburn University and his Juris Doctor from the University of Georgia School of Law in 1991. From 1991–2002, he served as a Volunteer Leader of Young Life Ministries and is currently a Board Member of Atlanta Youth Academy and the Director of Teen Ministry at Southwest Christian Fellowship Church.

While at Auburn University, Melton served as the Student Government Association President for the 1987-88 academic year. He was the first African-American student elected to that position in Auburn history. He was also the first "independent" (non-fraternity member) to be elected to that position. The Melton Student Center, at Auburn University, is named for Justice Melton.

Political and legal background 

Prior to joining the Court, Melton served as Executive Counsel to Governor Perdue.  Before serving as Executive Counsel, Melton spent 11 years as Assistant Attorney General in the Georgia Department of Law.

Service on the Georgia Supreme Court and after

Melton was first appointed to the Court by Governor Sonny Perdue on July 1, 2005, to fill a vacancy on the bench created by the retirement of Justice Norman S. Fletcher. His appointment marked the first time a Republican governor had made an appointment to the Supreme Court since 1868 when Governor Rufus B. Bullock selected Justices Joseph E. Brown and H. K. McCay. He was sworn in as Chief Justice on September 4, 2018 by former Chief Justice Harris Hines. On February 12, 2021, Melton announced his intent to retire effective July 1, 2021. He accepted a partnership in Troutman Pepper effective July 19, 2021.

References

External links

Website of the Supreme Court of Georgia
Press release from Governor Perdue's office announcing Justice Melton's appointment

|-

1966 births
Living people
20th-century American lawyers
20th-century African-American people
21st-century American judges
21st-century American lawyers
21st-century African-American people
African-American judges
African-American people in Georgia (U.S. state) politics
Auburn University alumni
Chief Justices of the Supreme Court of Georgia (U.S. state)
Justices of the Supreme Court of Georgia (U.S. state)
University of Georgia alumni